Siegfried Placzek, (1866 Schwersenz, Germany – March 8, 1946, New York City, New York, USA) was a prominent German-born neurologist and psychiatrist.

Biography 
Born in Schwersenz (now part of Poland), Siegfried Placzek studied medicine at the universities of Berlin, Kiel, Leipzig and Jena. He traveled to America in 1893 on a study tour, publishing his findings in a book, Medical Science in the United States published in 1893.  In 1899 he married Elise Hirschwald. The couple had two children, Dr. Henry Platt (AKA Heinz Placzek) of New York, NY, (1903–1955) and Dr. Gerda Haupt (1901–1989). Dr. Gerda Haupt moved with her two daughters Helga (born 1928 in Geneve) and Hildegard (born 1934 in Charlottenburg) from Germany to Santiago de Chile in November 1937. Dr. Siegfried Placzek and Elise Hirschwald were divorced in 1910.

Career
According to his New York Times obituary, Placzek was "recognized as a keen diagnostician and as the leading opponent of extremes in psychoanalysis."  Dr. Placzek was also an authority on hypnotism and occultism.  As a pioneer in the study of effects of air travel and high altitudes, he made many balloon ascents around the turn of the 20th century to study the effects of high altitudes on human psychological behavior. For many years he was employed as a neurological expert by the German railway systems and did considerable work as a medical expert in criminal trials.
 
In 1939, upon retiring, Placzek moved to America to escape Nazi persecution where he devoted much of his time to studying and lecturing. He is the author of numerous books on human sexuality, achieving a wide reputation in the field as the author of The Sex Life of Man, a textbook for the medical and legal professions. His other published works span a quarter of a century, including a number of treatises on work in his field, all published in German. He is also the author of studies on accident neurosis and a volume dealing with the physician’s obligation to professional secrecy.

Publications
 His published works include the following:
 Die medicinische Wissenschaft in den Vereinigten Staaten, 1894.
 Auf dem Rade : Eindrücke und Erfahrungen gesammelt auf Wanderfahrten durch den Schwarzwald, Ober-Bayern, Schweiz, Tirol, Ober-Italien, 1897.
 Selbstmordverdacht und Selbstmordvermutung: eine Anleitung zur Propylaxe fur Aerzte, Geistliche, Lehrer und Verwaltungsbeamte, 1915.
 Freundschaft und Sexualitat Dritte, wider vermehrte Auflage. Berlin, Marcus & Websterm 1917.
 Kunstliche Fehlgeburt und kunstliche Unfruchtbarkeit: ihre Indikationen, Technik un Rechtslage; ein Handbuch,  von Prof. Dr. C. Adam, Hrsg. Von Dr. Med. Placzek., 1918.
 Das Geschlechtsleben der Hysterischen. Eine medizinisch, soziologische und forensische Stude. Bonn, Marcus & Weber, 1919.
 Homosexualitat und Recht, 1925.
 Erotik und Schaffen. Berlin und Koln, Marcus & Weber, 1934.
 The Sexual Life of Man, An Outline for Students, Doctors and Lawyer.JohnBale, Sons & Danielsson, Ltd., Oxford house, 83-91, Great Titchfield Street, W.I, 1923.

References

1866 births
German neurologists
1946 deaths
University of Jena alumni
University of Kiel alumni
Leipzig University alumni
German emigrants to the United States
Free University of Berlin alumni